Maybe This Time is an American sitcom television series which aired on ABC from September 15, 1995, to February 17, 1996. It was created by Michael Jacobs and Bob Young.

The series stars Marie Osmond as a mother and recent divorcee running the family bakery with her mother (Betty White) while raising her 11-year-old daughter (Ashley Johnson). The show's supporting cast includes Amy Hill, Craig Ferguson and Dane Cook, who joined the cast midway through its run.

Synopsis
The series revolved around two elements, the relationships between three generations of women and the bakery which the elder two owned and operated in Haverford, Pennsylvania, a suburb of Philadelphia. Thirtysomething Julia Wallace (Osmond), recovering from a divorce, puts her work running the bakery with her mother Shirley (White) and raising her daughter Gracie (Johnson) over trying to find romance once again. Julia's take comes much to the objection to the man-obsessed Shirley (a variation of White's Sue Ann Nivens from The Mary Tyler Moore Show) and the pre-adolescent Gracie who was waiting for her first kiss at the series outset. Outside of the opposite sex, the dynamics of the relationships between the three characters are explored.

Julia and Shirley were helped at the bakery by Scottish émigré Logan McDonough (Ferguson) whose views complemented those of his bosses. The most frequently seen customer on the series was Kay Ohara (Hill), owner of the pawn shop down the street from the bakery. Assorted other townspeople also came in and out of the bakery as well.

Additions
Midway through the run, two other characters were added. Kyle (Cook), the quarterback of the football team at an unnamed local college, came in to help out at the bakery while Gracie gained an on-again, off-again boyfriend in the streetwise Nicky (Ross Malinger). The introduction of Nicky coincided with Julia dating his father, Nick Sr. (Robert Cicchini) though their date did not progress any further unlike their children.

Cast and characters
Marie Osmond as Julia Wallace
Betty White as Shirley Wallace
Ashley Johnson as Gracie Wallace
Amy Hill as Kay Ohara
Craig Ferguson as Logan McDonough
Ross Malinger as Nicky
Robert Cicchini as Nick Sr.
Dane Cook as Kyle

Episodes

Production

Boy Meets World connection
The episode "Acting Out" featured Ben Savage, Rider Strong and William Daniels making cameo appearances as Cory Matthews, Shawn Hunter and George Feeny, their characters from Michael Jacobs's other ABC sitcom Boy Meets World. However, the two series do not exist in the same fictional universe as they appeared in the form of television characters in a fictional episode of Boy Meets World being watched by Gracie, who later had a waking dream about them.

Cancellation
The series initially entered the Top 20 with the debut of its preview episode on September 15, 1995, but later ranked #47 in its Saturday night timeslot. ABC canceled the series after 18 episodes.

Awards and nominations

References

External links

1995 American television series debuts
1996 American television series endings
1990s American sitcoms
American Broadcasting Company original programming
English-language television shows
Television series by ABC Studios
Television shows set in Philadelphia
Television series created by Michael Jacobs